Balaganapathy is a popular Malayalam soap opera that launched on Asianet. The first episode aired on 31 March 2014. It is relaunched in Asianet Plus from late 2016.

Plot
Balaganapathy tele serial tells the story of Ram, a ten-year-old child and his devotion to Lord Ganesha. Ram believes blindly in the powers of almighty and he learned about Lord Ganesha through the stories told by grandmother. Pooja is his best friend, who stays with him throughout his failures and gives him confidence. Their class teacher Sunitha is compassionate to Ram and wants to see him succeed in life. However, he fails to succeed in many of the tasks presented to him. In the story's turning point, Lord Ganesh himself takes the avtar of Balagnapathy to accompany Ram and his friends to overcome all difficulties in his life.

Cast

Main
Biswas Chimmaya as Balaganapathy / Lord Ganesha/Vighnu 
Siddharth Ajithkumar as Ram Gopal Varma
Niranjana as Pooja Manohar
Sibin Sakaria as Thadiayan / Rohit 
Adityan as Motta / Sunder 
Dileep Shankar as Gopal Varma / Gopalan (Ram's father)
Souparnika Vijay as Sunitha Teacher (Ram's teacher)
Sajitha Betti as Radhika Varma

Supporting
Priya Mohan as Sunanda (Kunjappu's daughter)
Kollam Thulasi as Kunjappu
Poojappura Radhakrishnnan  as Kaimal (Radhika's father) 
Ambika Mohan as Aayamma
G S Sudheer as Advocate Vikraman
Mahesh as ACP Manohar (Pooja's father)
Geetha Nair as Remaniamma (Sunitha's mother)
Sethu Lakshmi as Kichammayi
Azeez as Milkman Supran 
Harikumaran Thambi as Ram's school principal
Kalyan Khanna

Awards
Won-Asianet Television awards 2015

Best Character actor (Special Jury) -Mahesh

Won- Asianet Television awards 2014
Best Child Artist-Biswas, Sidharth, Sebin, Niranjana, Adityan.
Best director

Nominated-Asianet Television awards 2015
Best Character Actor- Dileep Sankar
Best actress in a negative role-Sajitha Betti

References

External links
 Official Website on hotstar

Malayalam-language television shows
2014 Indian television series debuts
Asianet (TV channel) original programming
Superhero television shows
2015 Indian television series endings
Indian children's television series
Indian fantasy television series